Levan Tediashvili (born 15 March 1948 in Gegmoubani, Georgian SSR) is a former Soviet (Georgian) wrestler and Olympic champion in Freestyle wrestling in 1972 and 1976. He remained undefeated between 1971 and 1976. Besides freestyle wrestling, he was also a Soviet and world champion in sambo.

Olympics
Tediashvili won gold medal at the 1972 Summer Olympics in the middleweight class. At the 1976 Summer Olympics he received gold medal in the light heavyweight class. While winning these titles, he defeated two brothers, John Peterson in 1972 and Ben Peterson in 1976. John won a gold medal in 1976 and Ben won a gold medal in 1972, in the weight categories where Tediashvili did not compete.

World and European championships
Tediashvili won a gold medal in the 82 kg class at the 1971 FILA Wrestling World Championships, and gold medals in the 90 kg class in 1973, 1974 and 1975. At the 1978 FILA Wrestling World Championships he received a silver medal in the 100 kg class. He also won European titles in 1974, 1976 and 1978.

Biography and awards
Tediashvili was born to a Georgian father, invalid of World War II, and a Russian mother, who moved to Georgia with her other son Herman after her husband was killed in World War II. Herman also became wrestler and then worked as wrestling coach in Chișinău.

Tediashvili was selected among the Soviet Union top ten athletes of the year in 1973 by the Federation of Sports Journalists of the USSR. In 1976, he was awarded the Order of Lenin.

In 1987, he and Georgian Olympic cyclist Omar Pkhakadze played two heroes in the historical Georgian film Khareba da Gogia. The film director Georgiy Shengelaya chose them instead of professional actors for their athletism, charisma and energy required for these roles; their assistants in the film were also played by sportsmen, world champions in wrestling.

Tediashvili fought in the Abkhazian War, along with his son, who was killed in the conflict. From 1995 to 2003, he was a parliamentary deputy from a district of Kakheti.

In 2021, Tediashvili played the starring role of a former wrestling champion in Levan Koguashvili's feature film Brighton 4th, for which he was awarded Best Actor at the 2021 Tribeca Film Festival, and Outstanding Individual Performance at FilmFestival Cottbus 2021.

References

External links

1948 births
Living people
People from Kakheti
Soviet male sport wrestlers
Olympic wrestlers of the Soviet Union
Wrestlers at the 1972 Summer Olympics
Wrestlers at the 1976 Summer Olympics
Male sport wrestlers from Georgia (country)
Olympic gold medalists for the Soviet Union
Olympic medalists in wrestling
World Wrestling Championships medalists
Medalists at the 1976 Summer Olympics
Medalists at the 1972 Summer Olympics
Communist Party of the Soviet Union members
Recipients of the Presidential Order of Excellence
Military personnel from Georgia (country)
Members of the Parliament of Georgia
Georgia
Recipients of the Order of Lenin
Honoured Masters of Sport of the USSR